The 23rd Senate District of Wisconsin is one of 33 districts in the Wisconsin State Senate.  Located in northwest Wisconsin, the district comprises all of Chippewa County and most of Clark County, as well as eastern Eau Claire County, eastern Dunn County, western Marathon County, and parts of northwest Jackson County and northeast Trempealeau County.  The district is mostly rural, but contains the cities of Black River Falls and Chippewa Falls, most of the city of Marshfield, and part of the city of Eau Claire.

Current elected officials
Jesse James is the senator representing the 23rd district since January 2023. He previously served in the State Assembly, representing the 68th Assembly district from 2019 to 2023.

Each Wisconsin State Senate district is composed of three Wisconsin State Assembly districts.  The 23rd Senate district comprises the 67th, 68th, and 69th Assembly districts.  The current representatives of those districts are:
 Assembly District 67: Rob Summerfield (R–Bloomer)
 Assembly District 68: Karen Hurd (R–Fall Creek)
 Assembly District 69: Donna Rozar (R–Marshfield)

The 23rd Senate district crosses two congressional districts.  The portion of the district in Dunn County, Eau Claire County, Trempealeau County, southern Chippewa County, and part of northwest Jackson County fall within Wisconsin's 3rd congressional district, which is represented by U.S. Representative Ron Kind; the remainder of the district in northwest Jackson County, the remainder of Chippewa County, and the portions of the district in Clark, Wood, and Marathon counties falls within Wisconsin's 7th congressional district, which is represented by U.S. Representative Tom Tiffany.

Past senators
The district has previously been represented by:

Note: the boundaries of districts have changed repeatedly over history. Previous politicians of a specific numbered district have represented a completely different geographic area, due to redistricting.

References

External links
District Website
Senator Moulton's Website

Wisconsin State Senate districts
Barron County, Wisconsin
Chippewa County, Wisconsin
Clark County, Wisconsin
Dunn County, Wisconsin
Eau Claire County, Wisconsin
Marathon County, Wisconsin
Taylor County, Wisconsin
Wood County, Wisconsin
1852 establishments in Wisconsin